Santiago Hernández Vega (born 11 September 1992 in Medellín) is a Colombian former Grand Prix motorcycle racer, and the younger brother of former MotoGP racer Yonny Hernández. He has previously raced in the Spanish CEV Moto2 Series and in the Spanish Supersport Championship.

Career

Moto2 World Championship

2010
He participated in his first Grand Prix race at the age of 18, at the 2010 Aragon Grand Prix. Riding for Matteoni C.P. Racing as a replacement for Lukas Pesek, on a Moriwaki MD600 in the Moto2 class, he finished 23rd out of 28 riders, 45 seconds behind winner Andrea Iannone. He was the fourth out of five Moriwaki mounted riders who finished the race. He was then replaced for the next race by Ferruccio Lamborghini.

2011
In 2011, Hernandez joined the Thai Honda Singha SAG
SAG Team and raced a FTR Moto M211. He raced 16 out of 17 races, and scored a best of 21st place, thus failing to score points. He was even replaced by Raffaele de Rosa for one race, who also scored a 21st place in his only race with the FTR bike.

For 2012 he was left without a contract and he left the world championships.

Career statistics

Grand Prix motorcycle racing

By season

Races by year
(key) (Races in bold indicate pole position; races in italics indicate fastest lap)

References

External links
 Profile on MotoGP.com

Living people
1992 births
Colombian motorcycle racers
Moto2 World Championship riders